Shine is an unincorporated community in Jefferson County, in the U.S. state of Washington.

History
Phillip Noah Rasler originally submitted a request to name the community Squamish March 25, 1905, but after approval a month later the order of establishment was rescinded in October of the same year. Robert Alexander Slyter (Phillip Rasler's brother-in-law) resubmitted the request to name the community Squamish two years later, in October of 1907. This again was rescinded a year later with a final request to change the name to Shine. Robert Alexander Slyter was the first appointed postmaster of Shine, which was officially named January 15, 1909, and remained in operation until 1923. The community's name is a variation of "sunshine".

References

Unincorporated communities in Jefferson County, Washington
Unincorporated communities in Washington (state)